Take a Look is a compilation album by Aretha Franklin. It was released on September 5, 1967, by Columbia Records. In Europe this album was released by CBS Records, and it was titled Soul, Soul, Soul.

Track listing

1967 compilation albums
Aretha Franklin compilation albums
Columbia Records compilation albums
CBS Records compilation albums